Born Again Piss Tank is an album by Australian singer/comedian Kevin Bloody Wilson. Released in October 1987, the album peaked at number 16 on the Australian album chart.

Track listing
All tracks written by Denis Bryant.

"Born Again Piss Tank" - 5:33
"Kev's Love Song (Dinkum 'Bout Ya)" - 4:01
"Supa Mega Fugly" - 2:42
"Manuel the Bandito" - 3:57
"I Knew the Bride (When She Used to be a Moll)" - 4:12
"Fair & Just" - 3:13
"Anytime at All" - 2:44
"The Kid (He Swears a Little Bit)" - 5:52
"Dick On Her Mind" - 3:16
"Rootin' in the Back of the Ute" - 3:12

Charts

Certifications

References

External links
Official Website

1987 albums
Kevin Bloody Wilson albums
1980s comedy albums